His Master's Voice (HMV) was the name of a major British record label created in 1901 by The Gramophone Co. Ltd. The phrase was coined in the late 1890s from the title of a painting by English artist Francis Barraud, which depicted a Jack Russell Terrier dog named Nipper listening to a wind-up disc gramophone and tilting his head. In the original, unmodified 1898 painting, the dog was listening to a cylinder phonograph. The painting was also famously used as the trademark and logo of the Victor Talking Machine Company, later known as RCA Victor.

In the 1970s, an award was created which is a copy of the statue of the dog and gramophone, His Master's Voice, cloaked in bronze, and was presented by the record company (EMI) to artists, music producers and composers in recognition of selling more than 1,000,000 recordings.

The painting
The trademark image comes from a painting by English artist Francis Barraud titled His Master's Voice. It was acquired from the artist in 1899 by the newly formed Gramophone Company and adopted as a trademark by the Gramophone Company's United States affiliate, the Victor Talking Machine Company.

The logo

In early 1899, Francis Barraud applied for copyright of the original painting using the descriptive working title Dog looking at and listening to a Phonograph. He was unable to sell the work to any cylinder phonograph company, but William Barry Owen, the American founder of the Gramophone Company in England, offered to purchase the painting under the condition that Barraud modify it to show one of their disc machines. Barraud complied and the image was first used on the company's catalogue from December 1899. As the trademark gained in popularity, several additional copies were subsequently commissioned from the artist for various corporate purposes. 

In 1967, EMI converted the HMV label into an exclusive classical music label and dropped its POP series of popular music. HMV's POP series artists' roster was moved to Columbia Graphophone and Parlophone and licensed American POP record deals to Stateside Records.

The globalised market for the compact disc resulted in EMI abandoning the HMV label in favour of "EMI Classics", a name that could be used worldwide; however, between 1988 and 1992 Morrissey's recordings were issued on the HMV label. The HMV/Nipper trademark is now owned by the retail chain in the UK. The formal trademark transfer from EMI took place in 2003. The old HMV classical music catalogue is now controlled by the Warner Classics unit of Warner Music Group. Most reissues of HMV pop material that EMI previously controlled are now reissued on Warner's Parlophone label. In the UK, Warner Classics's online presence was launched as 'Dog and Trumpet' on Spotify, Facebook, Twitter and Instagram in January 2017.

Nipper worldwide

On 1 April 2007, HMV announced that Gromit, the animated dog of Wallace and Gromit, would stand in for Nipper for a three-month period, promoting children's DVDs in its UK stores.

HMV 

HMV shops in Australia, Ireland, and the UK also use the Nipper trademark. HMV applied for trademark status in order to use Nipper at HMV stores in Canada but in 2010 abandoned the application. 

As of August 2006, there were over 400 HMV stores worldwide. 

On 15 January 2013, HMV Group plc entered receivership; stores in Ireland closed 16 January 2013 and were no longer accepting vouchers. The HMV website posted a receivership notice and no further online sales were made.

As of 28 December 2018, HMV has confirmed that it has called in KPMG as administrators and entered administration for the second time in six years.

On 5 February 2019, the Canadian retailer Sunrise Records announced its acquisition of HMV Retail for an undisclosed amount (later reported to be £883,000). Sunrise planned to maintain the HMV chain and five Fopp stores, but immediately closed 27 locations. By late-February, HMV had reopened a number of stores (including 1 Fopp branch).

See also
 List of HMV POP artists
 List of record labels
 List of phonograph manufacturers

References

Further reading
 Barnum, Fred (1991). His Master's Voice in America.
 Southall, Brian (1996). The Story of the World's Leading Music Retailer: HMV 75, 1921–1996.

External links

 
 Musée des ondes Emile Berliner – Montréal 

British record labels
Re-established companies
EMI
RCA
Technicolor SA
Symbols introduced in 1899
Jazz record labels
British advertising slogans
1890s neologisms
Quotations from music
Dogs in art